Azoproite is a rare manganese iron borate mineral with the chemical formula (Mg,Fe)(Fe,Ti,Mg)(BO)O. It was first identified near Lake Baikal, Russia. It was named after the Association pour l'Etude Géologique des Zones Profondes de l'Ecorce Terrestre, whose acronym is AZOPRO in Russian.

References

External links 

 Azoproite data sheet
 Azoproite on the Handbook of Mineralogy

Manganese minerals
Iron(II,III) minerals
Titanium minerals
Magnesium minerals
Borate minerals
Oxide minerals